Martin Matje (1962–2004) was a French illustrator.

References 

1962 births
2004 deaths
French illustrators